Crihana Veche is a village in Cahul District, Moldova.

Sport
The village has a club called FC Speranța Crihana Veche who plays in Cahul. The team ended the season with 63 points and has promoted to Division ”A” after receiving national license. Then in 2011–12, FC Speranța Crihana Veche runner-up the "A" Division and promoted to the highest tier of Moldovan football Moldovan National Division for 3 seasons.

References

Villages of Cahul District